4104 (four thousand one hundred [and] four) is the natural number following 4103 and preceding 4105. It is the second positive integer which can be expressed as the sum of two positive cubes in two different ways. The first such number, 1729, is called the "Ramanujan–Hardy number".

4104 is the sum of 4096 + 8 (that is, 163 + 23), and also the sum of 3375 + 729 (that is, 153 + 93).

See also
 Taxicab number
 1729

External links
 MathWorld: Hardy–Ramanujan Number

Integers